Peechaankai ( Left Hand) is a 2017 Indian Tamil-language black comedy film written and directed by Ashok. It became the first Indian film to deal with a rare disease of alien hand syndrome as its main plot point. It starred R. S. Karthik in the lead role while Anjali Rao, M. S. Bhaskar, Vivek Prasanna, and K. S. G. Venkatesh played other pivotal roles. Featuring music composed by Balamurali Balu and cinematography by Gautham Rajendran, the film was co-produced PG Media Works and had a theatrical release on 15 June 2017.

Plot
S. Muthu alias Smoothu is a famous left-handed pickpocket who operates along with his gang Reeta and Ravi in Chennai. He does have some ethics, but a sudden accident causes him to suffer a brain injury which results alien hand syndrome (AHS). Smoothu's left hand stops obeying his command and gets a mind of its own. It becomes his moral self, stopping him from doing wrong things. He needs 3 Lakh rupees to cure his condition, so he takes up an assignment from a team of gangsters to steal a politician's phone. What happens next is a series of mishap comedies caused by his alien hand, which at last triumphs over the evil forces (the politician and gangsters).

Cast

R. S. Karthik as S. Muthu ("Smoothu")
Anjali Rao as Abhirami
M. S. Bhaskar as Thamizhmagan
Vivek Prasanna as Nallathambi
K. S. G. Venkatesh as Uthaman
Sruthi Menon as Rita
Arun as Ravi
Ponmudi as Gaja
Krish Haran as Krish
Jithendar as Joseph
Andrew Jaypaul as Maari

Production
Ashok, a software engineer-turned-filmmaker made a telefilm of the same name and due to creative differences, he could not get other producers on board. So R. S. Karthik, who played the lead in the telefilm, produced the Film Karthik was retained as lead in the feature film as well, and Anjali Rao, who played STR’s sister in Gautham Vasudev Menon's Achcham Yenbadhu Madamaiyada, essayed Karthik's romantic interest. Peechaankai which was shot in and around Chennai, with the first look being unveiled by filmmakers Karthik Subbaraj and Samuthirakani in February 2017. Actor Arya and director Gautham Vasudev Menon each released a singles of the film, actor Vijay Sethupathi released the trailer, and it became instantly viral. Stylist Sruthi Menon also made her acting debut in feature films through the project.

Release
The film was released on 15 June 2017 across Tamil Nadu and earned a positive review from the critic at The Hindu. A critic from Times of India noted Peechaankai is driven by its high-concept premise — what if our hand starts to have a mind of its own! Director Ashok sets his film based on this idea against a background that involves criminals and politicians, and gives us a black comedy that is certainly novel, mostly funny and somewhat overlong". A reviewer from Behindwoods.com gave the film a positive review, stating "the writing has been a big strength for the film and debutant Ashok has also cleverly worked on the screenplay at most parts", while "the film works well in most parts, as the audience connect well with the characters, thanks to the humour and again, the writing". The critic added "however, the slow pace of the movie, especially in the second half, is worrying and it takes some time to keep you engaged". Baradwaj Rangan of Film Companion wrote "The film is hit-and-miss. The director can certainly think out of the box... A film with this premise should have been way funnier."

Soundtrack
The soundtrack was composed by first-timer Balamurali Balu.

References

2017 films
2010s Tamil-language films
Indian black comedy films
Indian comedy thriller films
2017 directorial debut films
Films scored by Balamurali Balu